is known as a top high school in Shimizu, and one of the best high schools in Shizuoka Prefecture, Japan. Shimizu Higashi High School is famous for high academic achievement especially in science and mathematics field as well as competitive sports teams.

Notable alumni
Shimizu Higashi High School soccer team is a prestigious team, and a number of professional soccer players have graduated Shimizu Higashi High School. These include: Ryuichi Sugiyama, Kenta Hasegawa, Katsumi Oenoki, Nobuhiro Takeda, Naoki Soma, Akinori Nishizawa, Naohiro Takahara, Atsuto Uchida, among many others.

History
 1923 - The school received approval from the Ministry of Education to establish a middle school in Ihara, Shizuoka Prefecture area. 
 1924 - The school was opened as a middle school in the Ihara (Shizuoka Prefecture) area. 
 1939 - The school was renamed as Shimizu. 
 1948 - The school system was reformed by Daiichi Shimizu, Shizuoka Prefecture. Part-time courses were established for the students. 
 1968 - Science and mathematics department was established.

Science and mathematics
There is one class each year with an organization of about 40 people. Three different classes are not held annually. However, they have been fixed as well as the main teacher. Chemical, biological or physical sciences are what the "I" is required for. Currently, there is not a course in geology. "II" is for the two courses designated by his choice of subjects. The "Super Science Mathematics and Science" course is for the report card format that is also provided by the Ministry of Education, "Mathematics" along with "physics and mathematics" are listed as "professional education subjects and courses," which makes students earn credits.

The annual science and mathematics (which is the annual winter vacation), "Research challenges for science and mathematics" is about conducting research on issues of natural science. More than 2000 students enrolled in science and mathematics as a part of the activities of the Super Science High School program. The event was held in August 2006 at Pacifico Yokohama. During January 2006 (Super Science High School Student Research Conference year), the award-winning director prefecture's first Science and Technology Agency was granted. This event is considered to be the Grand Prix of the 1300 national high school science students who participated in school sciences in addition to mathematics. Gold, Silver, Bronze Award, were award (with the students winning one each). The year 2007 also saw two students being awarded with medals.

School facilities
The staff room, library, and the living room are all air-conditioned while the other main building is based on air-conditioned classrooms. Different parts of the school received air conditioning at different times, however. For example, the five classrooms in the west portion of the school are air-conditioned buildings power by electricity. The east side of the school has their classrooms' air conditioning powered by gas.

Other facilities include a new gymnasium auditorium (two floors, one floor of parking for the martial arts training room in the second floor), a gymnasium annex in the old pool for bicycles and club room camp - the swimming pool spans . The old gymnasium and the main auditorium are in the old wing while the new wing is connected to the new gymnasium.

Hisashi, a new gymnasium hall has already been completed in the main building. This part of the structure is constructed to be earthquake-proof.

References
 SBS International Cup Archives
 2000 Jubilo Iwata Players
 High School Ranking in Shizuoka

Educational institutions established in 1923
High schools in Shizuoka Prefecture
Schools in Shizuoka Prefecture
Buildings and structures in Shizuoka (city)
1923 establishments in Japan